Combustion was a computer program for motion graphics, compositing, and visual effects developed by Discreet Logic, a division on Autodesk.   It shares a timeline based interface and also a node based interface with Autodesk Media and Entertainment's (formerly Discreet) higher-end compositing systems Inferno, Flame and Flint.  This is in contrast to the exclusively either layer based or node based interface used by some other compositing applications.

Combustion was a main support software tool for Flame and Inferno.  Combustion was a superior software tool for vfx frame to frame painting, with some of functionalities still not currently included in other compositing software in 2019.

The last version of Combustion was Combustion 2008.  The end of its development was never officially announced, but the company was known to be concurrently developing a new compositing platform, Autodesk Toxik.

References 

Compositing software
Autodesk discontinued products